Dicropsocus is a genus in the Epipsocidae family, with three described species, all endemic to New Guinea and the neighbouring islands. The genus is characterised by a peculiar wing venation, with many supernumerary cells.

References 

Epipsocidae
Psocomorpha genera
Arthropods of New Guinea
Endemic fauna of New Guinea